Amphinomida is an order of marine polychaetes. The order contains two families:

 Amphinomidae Lamarck, 1818
 Euphrosinidae Williams, 1852

References

Polychaetes